Jämsä sub-region  is a subdivision of Central Finland and one of the Sub-regions of Finland since 2009.

Municipalities
Jämsä (22,392)
Kuhmoinen (2,458)

Politics
Results of the 2018 Finnish presidential election:

 Sauli Niinistö   65.3%
 Paavo Väyrynen   8.2%
 Laura Huhtasaari   7.9%
 Pekka Haavisto   6.8%
 Matti Vanhanen   4.1%
 Tuula Haatainen   4.0%
 Merja Kyllönen   3.3%
 Nils Torvalds   0.4%

Sub-regions of Finland
Geography of Central Finland